Nassella trichotoma, the serrated tussock, is a type of bunchgrass plant, native in Argentina, Uruguay, Chile, and Peru.

It is on the list of Weeds of National Significance in Australia, reducing the productivity of pasture and creating a fire hazard. In many states, landowners are required by law to keep their land free of this plant.

In New Zealand is classed as an unwanted organism by Biosecurity New Zealand and is under strict control regimes by some of the regional councils.

See also
 Nassella tenuissima, a weed of similar appearance that has also been recorded in Australia

References

Weeds Australia - Weed Identification - Serrated Tussock
Invasive Species - serrated tussock grass. Cyperales > Poaceae > Nassella trichotoma Hackel ex Arech.

External links
Weeds Australia - Weeds of National Significance - Serrated Tussock
Victorian Serrated Tussock Working Party

trichotoma
Bunchgrasses of South America
Grasses of Argentina
Flora of Argentina
Flora of Chile
Flora of Peru
Flora of Uruguay
Taxa named by Eduard Hackel